Mohammadreza Jounakizadeh was an Iranian football goalkeeper who played for Persepolis in 2001–02 Iran Pro League. He left the club at the end of season and joined Esteghlal Ahvaz.

Club career

Club career statistics

References

Living people
Iranian footballers
Persepolis F.C. players
Association football goalkeepers
Year of birth missing (living people)
Sportspeople from Khuzestan province